Barbara Berger (December 6, 1930 – January 27, 2016) was an American baseball catcher who played in the All-American Girls Professional Baseball League. Listed at 5' 2", 120 lb., she batted and threw right handed.

Born in Maywood, Illinois, Berger and her younger sister, Norma, played baseball and basketball together during their childhood and later played softball in grade school.

Berger entered the league in 1949 with the Chicago Colleens, a rookie touring team which played exhibition games against the Springfield Sallies as they travelled primarily through the South and East. The next season she was promoted to the Racine Belles, where she was used sparingly as a backup catcher. She hit a .176 average in 11 games. The same season, Norma Berger joined the league as a pitcher for the Sallies.

She left the league in 1951 to attend University of Illinois, where she earned bachelor's and master's degrees and taught at her alma mater for 19 years. She married George Brown in 1969, and lived in Murray, Kentucky.

In 1988, the Berger sisters received further recognition when they became part of Women in Baseball, a permanent display based at the Baseball Hall of Fame and Museum in Cooperstown, New York which was unveiled to honor the entire All-American Girls Professional Baseball League.

Career statistics
Batting 

Fielding

Sources

1930 births
2016 deaths
Baseball players from Illinois
Sportspeople from Maywood, Illinois
University of Illinois Urbana-Champaign alumni
Chicago Colleens players
Racine Belles (1943–1950) players
21st-century American women